Great Park Ice & FivePoint Arena is a 2,500 seat (FivePoint Arena) 4 rink (3 NHL and 1 Olympic) ice hockey facility in Irvine, California. It serves as the practice facility of the Anaheim Ducks, after leaving Anaheim Ice. The facility includes a team store, restaurant (Between the Rinks), pro shop, arcade, and other amenities. As one of The Rinks facilities, Great Park Ice offers youth and adult hockey, curling, ice skating lessons, figure skating, and public skating hours. The complex is also surrounded by Orange County Great Park which has other sports facilities.

On March 14, 2020, all Ice Management LLC. facilities, including the Great Park Ice & FivePoint Arena, suspended all operations due to the COVID-19 pandemic. Despite later resuming operations, Anaheim Ice facilities agreed to comply with ongoing California state COVID-19 guidelines in August 2020.   As part of the COVID response, the facility has been designated as the temporary home facility for the Ducks' AHL affiliate, San Diego Gulls, for the 2020–21 season instead of their normal home area Pechanga Arena.

Between The Rinks 
Great Park Ice features Between The Rink Family Restaurant. Also, on floor 1 is the Between The Rinks Café, which fans can get food before, after, or during a game. The Bar and Restaurant features many Flatscreen TVs showing different games. On one of the walls, there are many different hockey pucks with different logos on them. The restaurant serves varieties of pizza, burgers and sandwiches, beer, wine, tacos, and more.  As the name suggests, the Restaurant and bar are located between rinks.

Notable events

In popular culture 
FivePoint Arena, its locker rooms, the lobby, and the exterior of Great Park Ice were featured in the season finale of The Mighty Ducks: Game Changers, a television show based on The Mighty Ducks trilogy. The arena served as the site for a summer showcase, between the fictional Elite Ice Performance Center (EPIC) team, who's under the Ducks banner and an unnamed team from Canada. Anaheim Ducks alternate captain Cam Fowler makes an appearance in the episode, giving the Ducks team customized versions of their 2022 reverse retro jerseys. The names of the arena and entire facility isn't mentioned and is referred to just as the "Anaheim Ducks practice arena," however logos of both the facility and arena are shown in the episode.

Great Park Ice is the site of the Anaheim Ducks' media day, where videos are recorded for the scoreboard at the Honda Center

References

Ice hockey venues in California
Sports venues in Irvine, California
2019 establishments in California
Sports venues completed in 2019
San Diego Gulls
American Hockey League venues